BlackLace is an American, female-fronted heavy metal band from New York City, US, formed in 1981. The band has released two studio albums.

Band members
Maryann Scandiffio – lead vocals 
Carlo Fragnito – guitars
Anthony Fragnito – bass, vocals
Steve Werner – drums

Discography

References

External; links
Metal Archives
Discogs
Metal Maidens
Metallian
The BNR Metal Pages

Heavy metal musical groups from New York (state)
Musical groups established in 1981
Musical groups from New York City